Robert Hanson (born August 18, 1946) is an American conductor and composer known for his 37 years with the Elgin Symphony Orchestra which was named “Orchestra of the Year” three times by the Illinois Council of Orchestras and won the 2010 Elgin Image Award.  In July 2011, he resigned.  John von Rhein, music critic of the Chicago Tribune, named Hanson the 2003 Chicagoan of the Year.

References

American male conductors (music)
1946 births
20th-century American conductors (music)
Living people
21st-century American conductors (music)
20th-century American male musicians
21st-century American male musicians